The Assistant General Counsel of the Navy (Research, Development and Acquisition) (AGC RDA) serves as the chief acquisition attorney for the Department of the Navy (under the General Counsel of the Navy) and as the senior legal adviser to the Assistant Secretary for Research, Development and Acquisition (ASN (RDA)).

The office of AGC (RDA) includes more than 30 attorneys who advise the ASN (RDA) and the DASNs on a wide range of acquisition issues involving multibillion-dollar shipbuilding, aircraft and weapons programs.  The AGC also sets Departmental legal policy pertaining to government contracts and procurement matters.

The current AGC (RDA) is Thomas L. Frankfurt.

References

External links
 AGC (RDA) website
 General Counsel of the Navy

Office of the Secretary of the Navy